A Little Life-Opera is a 1998 Hong Kong film directed by Allen Fong.  The film, set in Fujian province, is filmed in the People's Republic of China and stars Yang Kuei-Mei and Winston Chao.

The dialogs of the film are entirely in Hokkien (Min Nan) and Mandarin.  It is Fong's last feature film as he has not made any more feature movies since.

Synopsis
Xueyan (雪雁, played by Yang Kuei-Mei) is a 40-something single mother who lives in the coastal region of Fujian province.  She has a daughter in her late teens and is part of a part-time Min opera troupe from the village.  When she is invited to perform with her troupe members for a show, she comes across Sanpeng (三朋, Winston Chao), a former troupe actor who is now a businessman.  Meanwhile, the troupe struggles to survive as modernity and Western habits clash with the traditional performance art.

External links
 IMDb entry

1998 films
Hong Kong drama films
1990s Mandarin-language films
Films directed by Allen Fong
1990s Hong Kong films
Films about Chinese opera